The 2017 Livorno floods took place in Livorno between 9 and 10 September 2017, causing the death of eight people.

References 

Livorno floods
Livorno floods
Floods in Italy
September 2017 events in Italy
Livorno
2017 disasters in Italy